Rick Pearson (born December 19, 1958) is an American professional golfer who formerly played on the PGA Tour and the Nike Tour.

Pearson was born in Marianna, Florida. He was the first player in Florida history to win back-to-back Florida State Junior College Championship titles. Pearson won the Florida State Amateur in 1978 and 1980. He attended the University of Florida where he won the Southeastern Conference (SEC) individual title in 1980 and was voted 1980 SEC player of the year. Pearson was also recognized as a second-team All-American in 1980. He turned pro later that year.

Pearson joined the PGA Tour in 1982 and played until the following year. He then played various tours until 1988, where he rejoined the PGA Tour for two seasons. He played on Tour until the following year but didn't find much success so he joined the Ben Hogan Tour (now the Korn Ferry Tour) in its inaugural year, 1990. He won the Ben Hogan Yuma Open while recording nine top-10 finishes en route to a 6th-place finish on the money list. He played on the Nationwide Tour until 1995 and picked up two more victories, the 1992 Ben Hogan Tri-Cities Open and the 1994 Nike Central Georgia Open.

Professional wins (3)

Nike Tour wins (3)

Nike Tour playoff record (1–1)

Results in major championships

CUT = missed the half-way cut
Note: Pearson only played in the U.S. Open.

See also

Fall 1981 PGA Tour Qualifying School graduates
1982 PGA Tour Qualifying School graduates
1987 PGA Tour Qualifying School graduates
1988 PGA Tour Qualifying School graduates
Florida Gators
List of Florida Gators golfers

External links

American male golfers
Florida Gators men's golfers
PGA Tour golfers
Golfers from Florida
People from Marianna, Florida
1958 births
Living people